The Arab People's Movement was a small Palestinian political faction, led by Naji Alush (Arab nationalist intellectual in the Fatah movement, general secretary of the Union of Palestinian Writers and Journalists). The group was founded as Alush left the Fatah Revolutionary Council in 1977.

References

Arab nationalism in the Palestinian territories
Arab nationalist political parties
Defunct Palestinian political parties
Fatah